A total solar eclipse will occur on Thursday, April 9, 2043. A solar eclipse occurs when the Moon passes between Earth and the Sun, thereby totally or partly obscuring the image of the Sun for a viewer on Earth. A total solar eclipse occurs when the Moon's apparent diameter is larger than the Sun's, blocking all direct sunlight, turning day into darkness. Totality occurs in a narrow path across Earth's surface, with the partial solar eclipse visible over a surrounding region thousands of kilometres wide.

It will be unusual in that while it is a total solar eclipse, it is not a central solar eclipse (when the  gamma is 0.9972 or larger). A non-central eclipse is one where the center-line of totality does not intersect the surface of the Earth. Instead, the center line passes just above the Earth's surface. This rare type occurs when totality is only visible at sunset or sunrise in a polar region.

Visibility
It will be seen fully from Russia's Kamchatka Peninsula, Magadan Oblast and on the north-east of Yakutia (in the morning on April 10 local time). It will be visible partially throughout on north-east of Russia, in Canada, Greenland, Svalbard and Iceland. It will be also partially visible from the western part United States including Alaska and Hawaii and North Pacific.

Settlements of total phase: Evensk, Omsukchan, Palana, Seymchan and Zyryanka.

Images 
Animated path

Related eclipses

Solar eclipses of 2040–2043

Saros 149

Metonic series

References

External links 
 http://eclipse.gsfc.nasa.gov/SEplot/SEplot2001/SE2043Apr09T.GIF

2043 04 09
2043 in science
2043 04 09
2043 04 09